Schönwald im Schwarzwald is a small village in the state of Baden-Württemberg in the Black Forest in southwest Germany, near the France–Germany border and Germany–Switzerland border.

Notable people
It is the birthplace of Franz Ketterer, who played a major role in inventing the first cuckoo clocks in 1737.

Sights 
 Triberg Gallows

References

External links
 Webcam in Schoenwald
  Information about Schönwald

Schwarzwald-Baar-Kreis